Captain William Gordon Rutherfurd CB, RN (1765 – 14 January 1818) was an officer in the Royal Navy during the French Revolutionary War and the Napoleonic Wars whose career was almost entirely conducted in the West Indies except for a brief stay in European waters during which he commanded the ship of the line  at the battle of Trafalgar.

Early life
Rutherfurd was born in Wilmington, North Carolina, United States, to loyalist parents in 1764. His father was John Rutherfurd of Bowland Stow and his mother, Frances, was the widow of Gabriel Johnston the late governor. The family returned to Scotland and the young William was educated at University of St Andrew. The Rutherfurds moved to the Caribbean during the Revolution and in 1788 William was sent to sea aboard . Rutherfurd was a capable sailor and possessed a large amount of patronage. He joined the 98 gun, second rate, the flagship of Sir John Jervis in the West Indies, shortly after the outbreak of the French revolutionary wars and in 1793 he was promoted to acting lieutenant with his position being confirmed on 9 January 1794.

Rutherfurd was in the thick of the action during the 1794 West Indies campaign, serving with distinction as a junior officer in command of a landing party; storming forts on Martinique and taking part in operations in St Lucia and Guadeloupe. 
He received several accolades for his actions including, on 4 July, promotion to commander of the 16 gun sloop, Nautilus.

Remaining in the Caribbean, Rutherfurd then made the next leap to Post captain on 15 November 1796. In this capacity he successively commanded: The frigate HMS Adventure, the third rate HMS Dictator, the third rate HMS Brunswick and the 5th rate HMS Decade. Rutherford was instrumental in several minor skirmishes with enemy shipping amongst the islands, including the capture of Curacoa in 1800 for which he was again lauded. He returned to home waters in HMS Decade in 1804 and joined the Channel Fleet in the blockade of Cherbourg. The following year he was granted the 74 gun new ship Swiftsure participating in the blockade of the French Atlantic Coast and in the summer of 1805 he was dispatched to join Admiral Nelson's fleet off Cadiz and so was present at the battle on 21 October.

Trafalgar
Situated far to the rear of Admiral Collingwood's division, Rutherfurd made strenuous efforts to reach the battle, but although she was quite a new ship Swiftsure had been at sea for sometime and so had damage to her hull which prevented her from making great speed. It thus took several hours for Swiftsure to reach the fight, but when she did she proved decisive in several of the southern combats, engaging at various times with the 80 gun Spanish ship, Argonauta and the 74 gun French ship, Achille.  had been dismasted and was being pounded by three enemy ships when from the gunsmoke emerged the Swiftsure, her crew cheering and her guns firing double shotted rounds into the enemy, principally the Achille which was dismasted and caught fire, flames racing through the wooden ship. As thousands of panicking French sailors jumped into the sea, Rutherfurd ordered his ship's boats to rescue as many survivors as could be found, pulling hundreds aboard his ship but losing several men when the Achilles magazines suddenly detonated, swamping one of his boats. Swiftsure then tried to engage the 74 gun Aigle and the 80 gun Neptune. Aigle moved away however when her captain spotted the arrival of HMS Polyphemus.

Following the battle, the barely damaged Swiftsure took the sinking Redoutable in tow but was forced to cut the line when the French ship suddenly sank. Amongst the hundreds who drowned were five Swiftsure men.
Rutherfurd returned to Gibraltar and from there travelled to Britain, where he was rewarded for his part in the action, but was then relegated to shore service and long periods of unemployment, unfortunately not possessing the seniority to make the jump to Admiral that so many of his contemporaries did.

Later career and death
Suffering from ill-health, in 1814 he was put in command of Greenwich Hospital and a year later was made a Companion of the Bath   upon the inception of that order. He died in 1818 after a long illness and was buried in the Church of St. Margaret, Westminster, where his grave marker is still visible. 

Namesake
The Royal Navy has named one ship for Rutherford, the frigate , which was in commission from 1943 to 1945 and saw action in World War II.

 Notes a.  Also spelled Rutherford.b  4 June 1815.c'''  Memorial: Wall marble tablet, St Margaret's Church, Westminster, London.

 References 

 Further reading The Trafalgar Captains'', Colin White and the 1805 Club, Chatham Publishing, London, 2005,

External links 
William Gordon Rutherford
Animation of the Battle of Trafalgar
 

1765 births
1818 deaths
Royal Navy officers
Companions of the Order of the Bath
Alumni of the University of St Andrews
People from Wilmington, North Carolina
Royal Navy captains at the Battle of Trafalgar
Royal Navy personnel of the French Revolutionary Wars
Royal Navy personnel of the Napoleonic Wars